Bel-Air-Val-d'Ance is a commune in the Lozère department in southern France. It was established on 1 January 2019 by merger of the former communes of Chambon-le-Château (the seat) and Saint-Symphorien.

See also
Communes of the Lozère department

References

Belairvaldance
Populated places established in 2019
2019 establishments in France